Alexander Wilson (birth and death dates unknown) was a U.S. Representative from Virginia.

Biography
Born in Virginia, Wilson completed preparatory studies.  He served as member of the Virginia House of Delegates, 1803 and 1804.

Wilson was elected as a Democratic-Republican to the Eighth Congress to fill the vacancy caused by the resignation of United States Representative Andrew Moore.
He was reelected to the Ninth and Tenth Congresses (December 4, 1804 –  March 3, 1809).

Electoral history

1804; Wilson was elected to the U.S. House of Representatives in a special election unopposed.
1805; Wilson was re-elected with 60.65% of the vote, defeating Federalist Robert Bailey
1807; Wilson was re-elected with 57.2% of the vote, defeating fellow Democrat-Republican Oliver Towles and Federalist Bailey.

Sources

Members of the Virginia House of Delegates
Year of birth unknown
Year of death unknown
Democratic-Republican Party members of the United States House of Representatives from Virginia